Josh Mulligan (born 12 November 2002) is a Scottish professional footballer who plays as either a midfielder or defender for Dundee.

Playing career

Club
Mulligan made his first team debut with Dundee in the final game of the 2018–19 season against St Mirren, in which he came on as a substitute. Mulligan would feature in the Scottish League Cup the following season.

In January 2020, Mulligan went on loan with Scottish League Two league leaders Cove Rangers until the end of the season. Despite the early curtailment of the season due to the COVID-19 pandemic, Cove were declared League Two champions after a resolution to finish the season from the SPFL was passed.

In October 2020, Mulligan signed a new contract with Dundee keeping him at the club until 2023, and immediately joined Scottish League One side Peterhead on a season-long loan. Mulligan suffered an ankle injury early on in his club debut against Dundee United, and in November would undergo surgery that would keep him out until the following season.

In June 2021, Mulligan would once again join Peterhead on a season-long loan. Despite this, Mulligan would represent Dundee B against Peterhead in the Scottish Challenge Cup. He would score his first senior goal with the Blue Toon in a 5–0 win against Dumbarton. During his successful 2nd stint with the club, Peterhead teammate and media personality Simon Ferry compared his work-rate to that of Gareth Bale, and described him as "powerful, strong and direct", and as a "Rolls-Royce" footballer.

After a successful first half to the season, Mulligan was recalled early by Dundee in January 2022. He would make his first start for the team in February, in an away victory over Heart of Midlothian. Mulligan would score his first goal for Dundee against his former club Peterhead in the Scottish Cup. His first league goal would come in a 3–1 victory over Hibernian.

Mulligan would score the winner for Dundee's first league win of the 2022–23 season in an away win over Raith Rovers. He followed that up a week later with a fine strike to seal a 4–2 victory over Arbroath.

International
Mulligan was selected for the Scotland under-21 squad in May 2022. He would make his international debut as a substitute in a goalless draw against Belgium in Group I of the 2023 UEFA European Under-21 Championship qualification. Five days later, he would make his first international start away to Denmark, and played the full 90 minutes in a 1–1 draw. In September 2022, Mulligan would score his first international goal in an away friendly against Northern Ireland.

Career statistics

Honours 
Cove Rangers

 Scottish League Two: 2019–20

References 

Living people
2002 births
Dundee F.C. players
Scottish footballers
Scottish Professional Football League players
Footballers from Dundee
Association football midfielders
Peterhead F.C. players
Cove Rangers F.C. players
Scotland youth international footballers
Scotland under-21 international footballers